aka Tora-san's New Romance is a 1972 Japanese comedy film directed by Yoji Yamada. It stars Kiyoshi Atsumi as Torajirō Kuruma (Tora-san), and Sayuri Yoshinaga as his love interest or "Madonna". Tora-san's Dear Old Home is the ninth entry in the popular, long-running Otoko wa Tsurai yo series, and the first to employ an opening dream-sequence, which became a standard feature of the series. It is also the first film in the series in which Tatsuo Matsumura plays Tora-san's uncle, a role he took over from Shin Morikawa who died after the eighth film.

Synopsis
Tora-san meets three women on vacation when he travels to Fukui. One of the women meets him at his home, and he believes she has fallen in love with him, unaware that she hopes to marry a potter in the countryside.

Cast
 Kiyoshi Atsumi as Torajiro
 Chieko Baisho as Sakura
 Sayuri Yoshinaga as Utako
 Tatsuo Matsumura as Kuruma Tatsuzō
 Chieko Misaki as Tsune Kuruma (Torajiro's aunt)
 Gin Maeda as Hiroshi Suwa
 Hayato Nakamura as Mitsuo Suwa
 Hisao Dazai as Tarō Ume
 Gajirō Satō as Genkō
 Chishū Ryū as Gozen-sama
 Masaaki Tsusaka as Noboru

Critical appraisal
Stuart Galbraith IV writes that Tora-san's Dear Old Home is a "typically fine early entry in the series' run", which shows Yamada and Atsumi still experimenting with the Tora-san character and stories. Galbraith singles out Yamada's portrayal of "fleeting friendships" in this film, pointing out, "Yamada's camera lingers on little details, especially the sadness of departing trains and the pain of saying goodbye." He points out that the film is also very funny, with Chishū Ryū performing an especially humorous scene as the Buddhist priest. The German-language site molodezhnaja gives Tora-san's Dear Old Home four out of five stars.

Availability
Tora-san's Dear Old Home was released theatrically on August 5, 1972. In Japan, the film was released on videotape in 1995, and in DVD format in 2008.

References

Bibliography

English

German

Japanese

External links
 Tora-san's Dear Old Home at www.tora-san.jp (official site)

1972 films
Films directed by Yoji Yamada
Films set in Fukui Prefecture
1972 comedy films
1970s Japanese-language films
Otoko wa Tsurai yo films
Shochiku films
Films with screenplays by Yôji Yamada
Japanese sequel films
1970s Japanese films